Sarab Khoshkeh may refer to:
 Sarab Khoshkeh-ye Olya
 Sarab Khoshkeh-ye Sofla